Zero: Fever Part.2 is the sixth extended play (EP) by South Korean boy group Ateez. It was released on March 1, 2021, with the track "Fireworks (I'm the One)" serving as lead single. The physical album comes in three versions: A, Diary, and Z, and received over 350,000 pre-orders, exceeding their previous release, Zero: Fever Part.1, by over 100,000 orders. The album is composed of seven tracks, and incorporates different genres such as hip hop, EDM, funk, R&B and soul.

Commercially, the album debuted at number one on South Korea's Gaon Album Chart, and number eight on Billboard World Albums Chart. The album's lead single, "Fireworks (I'm the One)", is Ateez's first song to chart on the Gaon Digital Chart, peaking at number 148. Zero: Fever Part.2 was certified double platinum on July 8, 2021 by Gaon Music Chart, for sales of over 500,000 physical copies.

Release and promotion 
A 'handwritten lyric video' of sidetrack "Celebrate" was premiered on November 17, 2020, as a 2nd anniversary celebration of Ateez's fandom, Atiny. The video was later listed private. On February 5, 2021, a teaser picture was posted on official social media accounts, and a new album titled Zero: Fever Part.2 was confirmed two days later.

The album was released worldwide in forms of digital download, streaming and CD on March 1, 2021, alongside a music video for lead single "Fireworks (I'm the One)". The group promoted the album on multiple South Korean music programs, including M! Countdown, Music Bank, Show! Music Core, Inkigayo, The Show, and Show Champion, with performances of the title song and also "Celebrate". They won a music show award with "Fireworks (I'm the One)" on March 9's The Show. A special 'Holdings version' music video of "Time of Love" from their variety show Salary Lupin Ateez was uploaded on March 11, and a special video of "Celebrate" was released by Ateez on March 14. Member Mingi was absent from music video filming and promotion activities due to his hiatus. However, he has taken part in audio recording of the tracks on the album.

Track listing

Charts

Weekly charts

Monthly charts

Year-end charts

Accolades

References

2021 EPs
Ateez albums
K-pop EPs